Full of Pep is a 1919 American silent comedy film, directed by Harry L. Franklin. It stars Hale Hamilton, Alice Lake, and Alice Knowland, and was released on May 26, 1919.

Cast list
 Hale Hamilton as Jimmy Baxter
 Alice Lake as Felicia Bocaz
Alice Knowland as the duenna
 Fred Malatesta as General Lopanzo
 Charles Hill Mailes as Escamillo Gomez
 Victor Potel as Beanpole
 R. D. MacLean as President Bocaz

References

External links 
 
 
 

Metro Pictures films
American silent feature films
American black-and-white films
Silent American comedy films
1919 comedy films
1919 films
Films directed by Harry L. Franklin
1910s English-language films
1910s American films